The 1924 Australasian Championships was a tennis tournament that took place on outdoor Grass courts at the Warehouseman's Cricket Ground in Melbourne, Australia from 19 January to 30 January. It was the 17th edition of the Australasian Championships (now known as the Australian Open), the 4th held in Melbourne, and the first Grand Slam tournament of the year. The singles titles were won by Australians James Anderson and Sylvia Lance.

Finals

Men's singles

 James Anderson defeated Bob Schlesinger 6–3, 6–4, 3–6, 5–7, 6–3

Women's singles

 Sylvia Lance defeated  Esna Boyd 6–3, 3–6, 8–6

Men's doubles

 James Anderson /  Norman Brookes defeated  Pat O'Hara Wood /  Gerald Patterson 6–2, 6–4, 6–3

Women's doubles

 Daphne Akhurst /  Sylvia Lance defeated  Kathleen Le Messurier /  Meryl O'Hara Wood 7–5, 6–2

Mixed doubles

 Daphne Akhurst /  Jim Willard defeated  Esna Boyd /  Gar Hone 6–3, 6–4

External links
 Australian Open official website

 
1924 in Australian tennis
1924
January 1924 sports events